Phil Carradice (born 1947), is a Welsh writer and broadcaster.

Carradice was born in Pembroke Dock.  He was educated at Cardiff College of Education and Cardiff University, and became a teacher and social worker.  After several years as head of Headlands Special School in Penarth, near Cardiff, he retired from the teaching profession to become a full-time writer.  He hosts a history series on BBC Radio Wales entitled The Past Master.

Carradice is a prolific public speaker and travels extensively in the course of his work.

Works

Fiction
Hour of the Wolf (1985)

Children's
The Bosun's Secret (2000)
The Pirates of Thorn Island (2001)
Hannah Goes to War (2005)
Black Bart's Treasure (2007)
The Wild West Story (2013)

Non-fiction
Failures of System (1976)
The Last Invasion (1992)
The Write Way (1996)
Welsh Islands (1997)
Shooting the Sacred Cows (1998)
Exploring the Pembrokeshire Coast (2002)
Wales at War (2005)
Coming Home: Wales After the War (2005)
A Town Built to Build Ships - A History of Pembroke Dock (2006)
Life Choices (2006)
People’s Poetry of the Great War (Cecil Woolf, 2007)
The Black Chair (2008)
People’s Poetry of World War Two (Cecil Woolf, 2009)
The First World War in the Air (Amberley, 2012)
1914:the First World War at Sea in Photographs (Amberley, 2014)
The Battles of Coronel and the Falklands: British Naval Campaigns in the Southern Hemisphere 1914-19 (Fonthill, 2014)
The Cuban Missile Crisis: 13 Days on an Atomic Knife Edge, October 1962 (Pen & Sword Books, 2018)

PoetryCautionary Tale (1998)Ghostly Riders'' (2002)

References

Sources
Brief biography

1947 births
Welsh poets
Welsh novelists
Living people
People from Pembroke Dock
BBC Radio Wales presenters